This is a list of Cambodian films from 2005.

References

2005
Films
Cambodian